This is a list of active and extinct volcanoes in the Comoros.

References

Comoros
 
Volcanoes